The East of Scotland Cricket Association (ESCA) manages amateur cricket in the east of Scotland.

From Peebles in the South to Freuchie in the North, Largo and Dunbar in the East and Westquarter in the West, the ESCA covers a wide range of clubs forming eight divisions of amateur cricket.

ESCA comes under the overall National Governing body umbrella of Cricket Scotland.

External links
 Official Website

Cricket administration in Scotland